Slips (or SLIPS) may refer to:

Slips (oil drilling)
SLIPS (Slippery Liquid Infused Porous Surfaces)
SLIPS (company)
SLIPS (Sri Lanka Interbank Payment System)
Slip (cricket), often used in the plural form
The Slips, a UK electronic music duo

See also 
Slip (disambiguation)